Kallur Thekkummuri  is a village in Thrissur district in the state of Kerala, India.

Demographics
 India census, Kallur Thekkummuri had a population of 16945 with 8409 males and 8536 females.

References

Villages in Thrissur district